Alberto Cardone (1920–1977) was an Italian film director, screenwriter, second unit director and film editor of the 1960s.

Cardone is best known for his Spaghetti Western films of the 1960s. He is best known for directing the films Seven Dollars on the Red, One Thousand Dollars on the Black (1966) and Twenty Thousand Dollars for Seven (1969). In many of his films he worked with actor Anthony Steffen.

External links
 

Italian film directors
20th-century Italian screenwriters
German-language film directors
1920 births
1977 deaths
Italian male screenwriters
20th-century Italian male writers